The 2007 Grand Prix de Tennis de Lyon was a men's tennis tournament played on indoor carpet courts. It was the 21st edition of the Grand Prix de Tennis de Lyon, and was part of the International Series of the 2007 ATP Tour. It took place at the Palais des Sports de Gerland in Lyon, France, from 22 October through 28 October 2007.

The singles field featured ATP No. 5, Australian Open semifinalist, Queen's Club and Washington champion, 2005 Lyon winner Andy Roddick, Sopot and Metz titlist Tommy Robredo, and Australian Open semifinalist and Memphis winner Tommy Haas. Other seeded players were Wimbledon semifinalist, Mumbai titlist Richard Gasquet, Doha and 's-Hertogenbosch Ivan Ljubičić, Juan Mónaco, Nicolás Almagro and Gilles Simon.

Finals

Singles

 Sébastien Grosjean defeated  Marc Gicquel 7–6(7–5), 6–4
It was Sébastien Grosjean's 1st title of the year, and his 4th overall.

Doubles

 Sébastien Grosjean /  Jo-Wilfried Tsonga defeated  Łukasz Kubot /  Lovro Zovko 6–4, 6–3

External links
Official website
Singles draw
Doubles draw
Qualifying Singles draw

 
Grand Prix de Tennis de Lyon